Trichloroisocyanuric acid is an organic compound with the formula (C3Cl3N3O3).  It is used as an industrial disinfectant, bleaching agent and a reagent in organic synthesis.  This white crystalline powder, which has a strong "chlorine odour," is sometimes sold in tablet or granule form for domestic and industrial use. Salts of trichloroisocyanuric acid are known as trichloroisocyanurates.

Synthesis
Trichloroisocyanuric acid is prepared from cyanuric acid via a reaction with chlorine gas and trisodium cyanurate.

Applications
The compound is a disinfectant, algicide and bactericide mainly for swimming pools and dyestuffs, and is also used as a bleaching agent in the textile industry.  It is widely used in civil sanitation for pools and spas, preventing and curing diseases in animal husbandry and fisheries, fruit and vegetable preservation, wastewater treatment, as an algicide for recycled water in industry and air conditioning, in anti shrink treatment for woolens, for treating seeds and in organic chemical synthesis. It is used in chemical synthesis as an easy to store and transport chlorine gas source, it is not subject to hazardous gas shipping restrictions, and its reaction with hydrochloric acid produces relatively pure chlorine.

Trichloroisocyanuric acid as used in swimming pools is easier to handle than chlorine gas.  It dissolves slowly in water, but as it reacts, cyanuric acid concentration in the pool will build-up.

See also
 Comet (cleanser)
 Dichloroisocyanuric acid (Dichlor)
 Sodium dichloroisocyanurate
 Chlorine

References

External links
Symclosene data page
MSDS for Trichloroisocyanuric acid
Oxidation of primary alcohol to aldehyde

Antimicrobials
Organochlorides
Bleaches
Isocyanuric acids